The 2020 Four Continents Speed Skating Championships were the first edition of the championship and held from January 31 to February 2, 2020, at the Pettit National Ice Center in Milwaukee, United States.

Schedule 
All times are local (UTC–6).

Medal summary

Medal table

Men's events

Women's events

Participating nations
A total of 75 speed skaters from 9 nations contested the events. The numbers in parenthesis represents the number of participants entered.

 (1)
 (1)
 (15)
 (14)
 (8)
 (9)
 (13)
 (1)
 (13)

References

External links
Results

2020
2020 in speed skating
2020 in American sports
2020 in sports in Wisconsin
Sports competitions in Milwaukee
International speed skating competitions hosted by the United States
January 2020 sports events in the United States
February 2020 sports events in the United States